The list of ship decommissionings in 1946 includes a chronological list of ships decommissioned in 1946.  In cases where no official decommissioning ceremony was held, the date of withdrawal from service may be used instead.  For ships lost at sea, see list of shipwrecks in 1946 instead.


References

See also 

1946
 Ship decommissionings
 Ship decommissionings
Ship decommissionings